Hon. Charles Finch (4 June 1752 – 17 December 1819) was an English politician who sat in the House of Commons from 1775 to 1780.

Finch was the son of Heneage Finch, 3rd Earl of Aylesford and his wife Lady Charlotte Seymour, daughter of Charles Seymour, 6th Duke of Somerset. He was educated at Westminster School and matriculated at Christ Church, Oxford on 24 May 1769.  On 16 May 1772 he was admitted to Lincoln's Inn.

Finch was returned unopposed as Member of Parliament (MP) for Castle Rising at a by-election on 2 February 1775, on the interest of his cousin, Lord Suffolk. When his brother Lord Guernsey succeeded to the Earldom in 1777 he left his seat at Maidstone vacant. Finch convincingly won a contest at the by-election on 16 May 1777 and was returned as MP for Maidstone. He was defeated at 1780 general election.

Finch married Jane Wynne, the daughter of Watkin Wynne of Pentrefoelas, Denbighshire on 28 December 1778. He died on 17 December 1819. Their only child was their son was Charles Wynn Griffith-Wynne (4 March 1780 – 22 March 1865).

References

1752 births
1819 deaths
Younger sons of earls
People educated at Westminster School, London
Alumni of Christ Church, Oxford
Members of Lincoln's Inn
Members of the Parliament of Great Britain for English constituencies
British MPs 1774–1780
Charles